Manse is a ghost town in Nye County, in the U.S. state of Nevada. The GNIS classifies it as a populated place.

History
A post office was established at Manse in 1891, and remained in operation until 1914. Manse is a name derived from a Native American language meaning "brush".  Manse was also known as Manse Ranch, Whites Ranch and Younts Ranch.

References

External links
 Manse Ranch (ghosttowns.com)
 Manse Ranch: Gateway to the Future

Ghost towns in Nye County, Nevada